WVAD-LD, virtual and UHF digital channel 25, is a low-powered Daystar-affiliated television station licensed to Chesapeake, Virginia, United States. The station is owned by the Word of God Fellowship.

History

Originally, the station was owned by KM Broadcasting of Annandale, which is unrelated to KM Communications Inc. The station was on channel 60 as W60BR, but moved to channel 25 as W25CS on January 28, 2003 and became a Class A licensed station. The station was sold to Daystar on December 28, 2007 and changed its calls to WVAD-LP on October 13, 2010. The station converted to a digital signal in November 2012 and changed its call letters to WVAD-LD on January 23, 2013.

External links
VARTV Hampton Roads  Homepage

VAD-LD
Low-power television stations in the United States
1990 establishments in Virginia
Television channels and stations established in 1990
Chesapeake, Virginia